Independence High School, also referred to as IHS, is a public high school located in the Berryessa district of San Jose, California, United States. The school is operated by the East Side Union High School District (ESUHSD). Its namesake is the United States Declaration of Independence, which celebrated its bicentennial in the same year Independence High was established in 1976.

Independence is considered a magnet school, with three specialized programs, called "academies": electronics, finance, and teaching. Later magnet programs were extended into the performing arts and space technology, which were cut in 2009 due to budget constraints.

Independence students are called "sixers" and their mascots are named "Sammy the Sixer," who is an interpretation of an American Founding Father, George Washington, and "Amerigo the Eagle," who is a Bald Eagle, America's national bird.

Population

Demographics
Out of the sixteen high schools ESUHSD operates, Independence services the largest student population, with 3,054 students as of the 2013–2014 school year. Out of these, 3.7% identified as White, 2.7% identified as African-American, 34.1% identified as Hispanic or Latino, 54.9% identified as Asian (19.0% identified as Filipino), 0.2% identified as American Indian or Alaska Native, 0.7% identified as Pacific Islander, 0.8% gave either mixed or no response, 8.4% are students with disabilities, and 17.6% of the student population are considered English learners.

Class size
As of the 2008–2009 school year, the pupil-teacher ratio was 21.8 to 1, with 94.4% of teachers being fully credentialed; as of the same time, the full-time equivalent of Independence's teachers is 157.4. Class size at Independence is an average of 26.8 students.

Campus
Independence High School consists of over fifty buildings, each labeled with a specific letter. The four primary groups of buildings are referred to as the villas, including A-Villa (American Hall), which includes the school bank; B-Villa (Bicentennial Hall); C-Villa (Constitution Hall), which includes the disciplinary committee; and D-Villa (Democracy Hall). During the fall of 2005,
E-Villa (Eagle Hall) was removed indefinitely, only to be used as the name place for all music rooms. All villas are architecturally identical and surround a concrete clock tower in the middle of the school.

From 1976 to 1979, the Independence High gym hosted San Jose State University men's basketball games.

Other academic structures include complexes also labeled with letters, including the G-Complex, housing art classes; M-Complex, housing industrial classes; and the P-Complex, which are portable buildings currently in use by KIPP, which runs a charter school on campus called KIPP San Jose Collegiate. Independence also shares its campus with ACE Charter High School and Pegasus High School (alternative school). Pegasus uses what used to be known as the L- Complex. ACE moved into the H-Complex and shares the K-Complex with science classes that are part of Independence. In the summer before 2014–2015, Independence's administration office moved from the H-Complex to the N-Complex when they were rebuilding it after a fire damaged the complex. Along with the new administration offices, the school built a student center that quickly became popular with the students. B-Villa's main building was also affected by a fire in 2013 and opened for the 2016–2017 school year.

Along with a now-defunct planetarium, the school also houses Olympic-sized racing and diving pools, as well as an Olympic-regulation track. The Luis Valdez Center for the Performing Art went under construction in the summer of 2014. In the beginning of the 2012–2013 school year, the district gave all the high schools artificial grass fields in the stadium. Independence also contains seven tennis courts, four baseball fields, and two gymnasiums.

In fall of the 2013, the city opened a brand new public library right next to the G-Complex on Educational Park drive, using funds from bond measures passed in 2002 to construct 20 new public libraries in San Jose.

Extracurricular activities

Yearbook
The American was Independence High School's Columbia Scholastic Press Association Gold- and Silver Crown-winning yearbook. In 2008, Independence High School confirmed that The American would cease publication due to debt accumulation and budget problems.
In 2011 the school yearbook returned, using a site called MBROSIA, the students would be able to get a hard copy of their yearbook for their friends to sign, while also getting an online yearbook. In 2012 the school started using a different program with the company, Herff Jones. In 2013, the yearbook staff, along with Carla Hansen, and Stacy Johnson, kept the yearbook on and going, with the help of Yearbook, Editor-in-Chief, Alvin Castillo Bunales.

Yearbook was once a class at Independence, but was later removed due to lack of interest. In 2019, Yearbook Club was created by Editor-in-Chief, Katie Tran. Although Yearbook is now a club, it is planned to come back as a class in the near future.

Past yearbooks have been titled the following: "Written in the Stars" (2018), "Images" (2019), "Envision in 20/20" (2020), and "Just A Glitch" (2021).

Newspapers
Until the late 1980s, a student newspaper titled the Declaration of Independence was distributed throughout the school, though it eventually ceased publication. During the mid '80s into the 1990s the school newspaper carried the name "The Liberty." In 2004, three student papers—including The Independent Voice, The Independent Times, and a revived Declaration of Independence—were almost simultaneously founded, though by 2006 only The Independent Voice had any significant representation in the school. During the 2009–2010 school year, the Voice was the school's sole student-run, monthly newspaper, distributed throughout the school to selected classrooms and villas. As of the 2017–2018 school year, Graham Haworth, English teacher, re-established an official school newspaper called the "Common Sense". The publication is uploaded to the school website by the journalism class. All publication and equipment costs are funded solely through fundraisers and advertisement sales. Currently, the "Indy Insider" are the student newspaper being written and published in the 2022-2023 school year.

Band and orchestra
Independence High School's instrumental program, led by Professor Dr. Kenneth Ponticelli, includes Orchestra, Philharmonic Orchestra, Symphonic Band, Wind Ensemble, and Physics.

Under the direction of Bob Russell and Dan Smith, the marching band started with humble beginnings. Originally competing in jeans, T-shirts, and their trademark Cavalry Stetson hat. They found early success by defeating the powerhouse, and former National Champion Emerald Regime from Live Oak High School (Morgan Hill, CA). In 1979, the 76th Cavalry band made their first trip to Whitewater, Wisconsin to compete at the Marching Band of America National Championship. Their first endeavor came fractions of points away from the title. The band vowed to return. In the Summer of 1981, they did just that. The band completed their first undefeated season by capturing the MBA National Championship Title in 1981. Their repertoire was "Light Cavalry Overture" (Franz von Suppé), "Imaginary Voyage"(Jean-Luc Ponty), "Sud de la Ciudad Del Oro"(Mike Smith), "She Believes in Me"(Steve Gibb), "Fanfare for the Common Man"(Aaron Copland), "Simple Gifts/Appalachian Spring" (Aaron Copland/Elder Joseph Brackett). From there, the 76th Cavalry band went on an incredible winning streak and went undefeated for three more years. There were 12 members of the 76th Cavalry Band who won the National Championship at MBA and went on to win a World Championship with the Santa Clara Vanguard at the 1981 Drum Corps International Championships in Montreal, Canada. The band made a comeback in 2005 with a show entitled "The Art Of War", placing third overall in WBA class A, AA, and AAA Championships,  at Johansen High School in Modesto Ca. In 2006, the 76th Cavalry became Class AA Champion with a performance of Antonín Dvořák's New World Symphony, garnering 85.85 points at preliminaries and 87.69 at the finals—the first championships the Cavalry had won since 1981. The 76th Cavalry placed fourth in the overall A/AA/AAA classification. In 2007, the 76th Cavalry became Class AA Champion once again with a score of 82.5. This allowed them to advance into finals with all other A, AA, and AAA bands, where they placed fifth overall with a score of 84.1. In 2008, the 76th Cavalry placed second in Class A with a score of 80.40, clinching High General Effect and High Auxiliary captions with their show entitled "The Gathering, Selection by Rachmaninoff". In 2009, the band again took second place with a performance of Sergei Prokofiev's music from the ballet Romeo and Juliet with a score of 85.25; also earning High Percussion. They moved onto A, AA, AAA Finals, and placed 4th overall with a score of 88.10. One of the Cavalry's highest scores ever! They also took High Auxiliary. The 76th Cavalry has also been invited to London in Winter 2009 to play in a New Year's parade. In 2015, the band's performance of Steven Reineke's composition, The Witch and the Saint took second place in Class A once again with a score of 82.65, breaking 80 for the first time in 6 years. As of the 2015 season, the Cavalry's colorguard section remains undefeated in their class (Winter season included) for three full years. In 2017, the Cavalry brought back a win as Class A Champions with a score of 83.70, the cavalry's highest score since 2009, and first win since 2007! The show was entitled "Elements" and featured the music of Brian Balmages and Gustav Holst. The Cavalry achieved the high visual award, and the colorguard captured High auxiliary, sustaining an undefeated season!

The Wind Ensemble have placed first in their division in many Heritage Festivals. During spring break of 2007, the Wind Ensemble went to the New York Heritage Festival and took first in their division, along with winning an Adjudicator's Award for a score over 92, and another award for receiving the highest score of all the instrumental groups at the festival. They brought home two trophies and a plaque, along with an invitation to the 2008 Gold Festival in Boston. The Wind Ensemble has taken a Unanimous Superior in the CMEA Festivals for the past 3 years (2006, 2007, and 2008). They have also been invited to play in many places around the world, including Britain, Australia, and China.

Every year, Independence High School hosts the CMEA Orchestra Festival, using both facilities: the Luis Valdez Theater and the E-Building. In 2012, the Symphony Orchestra placed Unanimous Superior.

Keyboard and Vocal Music
Independence High School offers Class Piano in a modern piano lab with state-of-the-art electronic piano keyboard stations for each student. Piano is available for four years. Students present an annual monster concert each spring featuring solo and ensemble works for one to ten keyboards. Piano proficiency, general musicianship, and collaboration with other instrumentalists and vocalists is a priority of the curriculum.  In addition, individual students have the option to participate in the California Music Teachers Association Certificate of Merit Auditions each year.

Concert Choir is the ensemble for singers at Independence.  The curriculum stresses individual vocal development through vocalization, world music repertoire, music theory, and aural and reading skills grounded in the Kodaly solfege system.  The choir performs in the Fall Concert, Humming and Strumming in the Coffee House Winter Concert, a Fundraising Concert in January, a Spring Concert, the Final Concert, and Senior Honors Night.  Vocal music students frequently collaborate with members of the keyboard, guitar, and instrumental music ensembles for performances. Concert Choir participates in local and regional music festivals such as CMEA, ACDA, and the East Side District Choral Festival. Music students enjoy the Bay Area arts events together on field trips to Opera San Jose performances and local productions of Broadway Musicals.

Theatre
Independence High School's drama department annually produces a fall play and a spring musical. The productions are currently under the direction of Robin Edwards. Past plays have included Bus Stop (2005), The Miracle Worker (2006), A Midsummer Night's Dream (2007), Marisol (2008), An American Daughter (2009), Blithe Spirit (2010), Crimes of the Heart, The Laramie Project (2015), The Crucible (2016), The Comedy of Errors (2017), Pride and Prejudice (2018), and Arsenic and Old Lace (2019); past musicals have included Once on This Island (1999), Starmites (2000), Cabaret (2001), Pippin (2002), Grease (2003), Guys and Dolls (2004), Godspell (2005), Bat Boy: The Musical (2006), Little Shop of Horrors (2007), Footloose (2008), Starmites (2009), Chicago (2010), They're Playing Our Song (2011), You're A Good Man, Charlie Brown (2012), 25th Annual Putnam County Spelling Bee (2013), Seussical (2014), All Shook Up (2016), High School Musical (2017), Legally Blonde (2018), and Hairspray (2019).  In 2018, Independence instated its first ever International Thespian Society Troupe (Troupe #8575) In 2020, the IHS Troupe took a one-act version of Seussical Jr, under the direction of Kim Messersmith and Daniel Lopez, to the North California ITS One- act competition, winning 2nd place. The productions are held at Independence's on-campus theatre, the Center of Performing Arts.

Dance
Dance classes offered at Independence include Jazz Dance, Ballet, Modern Dance, Theatre Dance (also known as IndepenDANCE, Independence's student-run audition-only dance company). Ballet and Cheerleading are taught and coached by Cristina McClelland, Modern Dance is taught by Kellye Dodd, and Jazz and Theatre Dance are joint efforts. Independence is the only public high school that has Ballet course in entire California. The current(2022-2023)Cheer captain is Jenna Messer(Senior) and the co-captain is Deja Antes(Senior). Every year, the Jazz Dance classes perform at a school rally, while IndepenDANCE and the Spirit Squad performs several rallies throughout the year. The IndepenDANCE team holds a performance annually. Originally, Jazz Dance 1 was offered as physical education credit for students who had passed swim tests; however, Independence High School discontinued this practice in fall 2006, though Jazz Dance 1 may still be taken for the East Side Union High School District's performing arts graduation requirement.

Athletics
Most sports teams are divided among junior varsity and varsity teams, though Independence is one of the schools in the BVAL that does not offer a field hockey team. Independence High School is most well known for its badminton team, which has won many BVAL league titles and even a few CCS titles. It received and independence wrestling state title in 1995 and was runner-up in 1994, 1996, and 1997.

Rallies
At Independence, There are regular pep rallies. These rallies usually happen during an activity based time such as Welcome Back, homecoming, multicultural etc.,. At rallies, many fun activities happen including contests and games. Students sign up for these games. Classes usually compete with each other. Performances take place during rallies as well. The most notable performance come from dance based clubs. These clubs include are the Mabuhay Club, C.L.U.B, Idance, Cloud 9, and Kclub. Rallies are much enjoyable to watch and even better to partake in.

Roblox Independence High School
During the Corona Virus Outbreak, a group of students built the Independence High School Campus on the video game Roblox. The campus on the experience consists of the Independence Theater, ICafe, the Large Gym, etc. The map also consists of locations found outside of campus such as a few shops. Explore around the map and see what you can find!

Notable alumni
 Neil Kaplan, Voice actor</ref></ref>ef></ref> 
 Alana Evans, Adult film actress
 Eric Guerrero, three time NCAA wrestling Champion and 2004 Olympian
 Khaled Hosseini, Author of The Kite Runner and A Thousand Splendid Suns
 Sandra McCoy, Actress and dancer
 Mekenna Melvin, Actress

 Alejandro Soto, Actor
 Matt Sanchez, War correspondent and journalist
 John Tuggle, National Football League Player, member of the 1983 New York Giants, drafted with the final pick (nicknamed Mr. Irrelevant) of the 1983 NFL Draft.
 Thuy Vu, Broadcast journalist and TV host
 Rex Walters, National Basketball Association Player
 Ashley Urbanski, Professional wrestler
Jay Severson, 1998 PGL Starcraft World Champion and Co-Founder of Chess.com
Pamela Martinez, Professional wrestler

References

External links

 Independence High School Website
 76th Cavalry - Marching Band and Color Guard Website
 East Side Union High School District Website

East Side Union High School District
High schools in San Jose, California
Public high schools in California
Magnet schools in California
Defunct planetaria
Defunct college basketball venues in the United States
1976 establishments in California